Khilwa, in Shariah law, is an offense consisting of being caught alone in private with a member of the opposite sex who is not an immediate family member.

References

Interpersonal relationships
Sharia legal terminology